Africa (Persian: آفریقا‎) is a 2011 Iranian crime drama film directed and written by Houman Seyyedi.

Plot
Three young criminals are ordered to keep a girl inside a house until her brother pays his debts.

Cast 

 Shahab Hosseini as Shahab
Javad Ezzati as Shahram
 Amir Jadidi as Kasra
 Azadeh Samadi
 Mina Sadati
Omid Tabrizi Zadeh
 Mansour Shahbazi

References

External links 

Film noir
Iranian drama films
2010s Persian-language films
All articles with unsourced statements
2011 films
2011 drama films